The Estadi Mahonés is a football stadium in Mahón, Menorca, Spain.

References

Football venues in the Balearic Islands
Mahón